The Ulhasnagar Municipal Corporation (UMC) is the governing body of the city of Ulhasnagar in the Indian state of Maharashtra. It is part of the Mumbai Metropolitan Region and Thane district (Urban) in Konkan division. It has 78 members. Municipal Corporation mechanism in India was introduced during British Rule with formation of municipal corporation in Madras (Chennai) in 1688, later followed by municipal corporations in Bombay (Mumbai) and Calcutta (Kolkata) by 1762. Ulhasnagar  Municipal Corporation is headed by Mayor of city and governed by Commissioner. Ulhasnagar  Municipal Corporation has been formed with functions to improve the infrastructure of town.

List of Mayor

List of Deputy Mayor

List of Chairman, Standing Committee

Overview 
The municipal corporation consists of democratically elected members, is headed by a mayor and administers the city's infrastructure, public services and police. Members from the state's leading various political parties hold elected offices in the corporation.

Revenue sources 

The following are the Income sources for the Corporation from the Central and State Government.

Revenue from taxes 
Following is the Tax related revenue for the corporation.

 Property tax.
 Profession tax.
 Entertainment tax.
 Grants from Central and State Government like Goods and Services Tax.
 Advertisement tax.

Revenue from non-tax sources 

Following is the Non Tax related revenue for the corporation.

 Water usage charges.
 Fees from Documentation services.
 Rent received from municipal property.
 Funds from municipal bonds.

Corporation Election 2012

Political performance in Election 2012 
The results of Election 2012 are as follows.

Corporation Election 2017

Political performance in Election 2017 
The results of Election 2017 are as follows.

References

External links 
 Ulhasnagar Municipal Corporation, Official website

Ulhasnagar
Municipal corporations in Maharashtra
Year of establishment missing